Strictly Come Dancing returned for its second series on 23 October 2004 on BBC One. Bruce Forsyth and Tess Daly returned to present the main show on BBC One, while Claudia Winkleman presented a new spin-off show called Strictly Come Dancing: It Takes Two on BBC Two. Series 1 winner Natasha Kaplinsky filled in for Daly during the first five weeks due to maternity leave. Len Goodman, Bruno Tonioli, Craig Revel Horwood and Arlene Phillips returned to the judging panel.

The winner was actress Jill Halfpenny along with her dancing partner Darren Bennett, and their Jive in the final was the first dance to score a perfect 40 in the show's history.

Couples
The ten professionals and celebrities that competed were:

Scoring chart

Average chart

This table only counts for dances scored on a traditional 40-point scale.

Highest and lowest scoring performances 
The best and worst performances in each dance according to the judges' scores are as follows:

Aled Jones is the only celebrity not to land on this list.

Couples' highest and lowest scoring dances

Weekly scores and songs
Unless indicated otherwise, individual judges scores are given (in parenthesis) in this order from left to right: Craig Revel Horwood, Arlene Phillips, Len Goodman, Bruno Tonioli.

Week 1
Running order

° This week featured the lowest scoring dance in Strictly history, performed by Quentin & Hazel.

° Quentin & Hazel were also awarded the first ever 'one' awarded by both Craig and Arlene. This is the only dance in the shows' history to have received two 'ones' and the only 'one' ever awarded by Arlene.

Week 2
Running order

° This week featured the lowest scoring Quickstep in Strictly history, performed by Diarmuid & Nicole.

Week 3

Running order

Week 4
Running order

Week 5: Blackpool Week

Running order

Week 6: Quarter-final

Week 7: Semi-final

Running order (Round 1)

Running order (Round 2)

Week 8: Final (At Blackpool)

Running order (Part 1)

Running order (Part 2)

Running order (Part 3)

° This week featured the first 'ten' ever awarded for a Ballroom routine in Strictly history (Denise & Ian's Quickstep). The tens were awarded, by Arlene and Bruno.

° This week also featured the first perfect score from the judges awarded to Jill & Darren's Jive.

Dance chart

  Highest scoring dance
  Lowest scoring dance

The dances performed during Series 2 were as follows:

Week 1: Cha Cha Cha or Waltz
Week 2: Rumba or Quickstep
Week 3: Jive or Tango
Week 4: Paso Doble or Foxtrot
Week 5 (Blackpool Week): Samba
Week 6: Two Unlearned Dances from Weeks 1–2
Week 7: Two Unlearned Dances from Weeks 3–4
Week 8 (Final): Favourite ballroom, favourite Latin & Showdance

Notes

Season 02
2004 British television seasons